Carter Campbell (born September 29, 1947) is a former American football defensive end and linebacker. He played for the San Francisco 49ers in 1970, the Denver Broncos in 1971 and for the New York Giants from 1972 to 1973.

Campbell was outspoken during the 1974 NFL strike and believed he was cut by the Giants before the 1974 season as punishment.  Campbell stated that "Everyone who spoke out will be punished just like they are punishing me."

References

1947 births
Living people
American football defensive ends
American football linebackers
Weber State Wildcats football players
San Francisco 49ers players
Denver Broncos players
New York Giants players